A  is a short Renaissance arming sword, notable for its sturdy build and a distinctive s-shaped or figure-8 shaped guard. Measuring 70–80 cm long and weighing 0.8-1.5 kg, it was the signature blade of the Landsknecht.

Overview
The  is a side-arm, often used by pikemen, archers, and crossbowmen as a last resort if the enemy were to draw too close for bows or pikes to be effective.

Mostly a cutting sword, the rounded tips on many examples are ill-suited to thrusting, while the flat, broad blades are specialized for cutting. As with other similar cutting-centric arming swords, it can still be used for thrusting, though it is only likely to do damage to unarmored targets.

As with many sword varieties, variations exist within the type and katzbalger-style hilts can be found paired with slimmer and more thrust-oriented blades.

The large, characteristic guard helps to block and parry other cutting attacks. However, its openings leave the hands vulnerable to thrusting attacks.

Terminology
There are several different explanations about the origin of the name : one is that it comes from the custom of carrying a sword without a scabbard, held only by a cat's skin (German word  means "cat", while  means the skin (fur) of an animal. 

The most common translation is "cat-gutter", with an allusion to cat fight.

See also
List of daggers
Baselard
Swiss arms and armour
Cinquedea
Types of swords

References

Renaissance-era swords
German words and phrases